The People's Unity Party  (PUP)  was a political party in Gabon.

History
The party was established by Louis-Gaston Mayila in 1991, and supported President Omar Bongo of the Gabonese Democratic Party in the 1993 presidential elections. It won one seat in the 2001 parliamentary elections.

References

Defunct political parties in Gabon
Political parties established in 1991
1991 establishments in Gabon